The Wichelplanggstock is a mountain of the Urner Alps, located near the Susten Pass in the canton of Uri. It lies just south of the Grassengrat, where the border with the canton of Obwalden runs.

References

External links
 Wichelplanggstock on Hikr

Mountains of the Alps
Mountains of Switzerland
Mountains of the canton of Uri